A Slip of the Keyboard is the first non fiction anthology by Terry Pratchett. It was first published in 2014, with foreword by Neil Gaiman.

Contents
The anthology is divided into the main sections with contents as follows:

A Scribbling Intruder
Thought Progress (1989)
Palmtop (1993)
The Choice Word (2000)
How to Be a Professional Boxer (2005)
Brewer’s Boy (1999)
Paperback Writer (2003)
Advice to Booksellers (1999)
No Worries (1998)
Conventional Wisdom (2011)
Straight from the Heart, via the Groin (2004)
Discworld Turns 21 (2004)
Kevins (1993)
Wyrd Ideas (1999)
Notes from a Successful Fantasy Author: Keep It Real (2007)
Whose Fantasy Are You? (1991) 
Why Gandalf Never Married (1985)
Roots of Fantasy (1989)
Elves Were Bastards (1992)
Let There Be Dragons (1993)
Magic Kingdoms (1999)
Cult Classic (2001)
Neil Gaiman: Amazing Master Conjuror (2002)
2001 Carnegie Medal Award Speech (2002)
Boston Globe–Horn Book Award Speech for Nation (2009)
Watching Nation (2009)
Doctor Who? (2001)
A Word About Hats (2001)

A Twit and a Dreamer
The Big Store (2002)
Roundhead Wood, Forty Green (1996)
A Star Pupil (2011)
On Granny Pratchett (2004)
Tales of Wonder and of Porn (2004)
Letter to Vector (1963)
Writer’s Choice (2004)
Introduction to Roy Lewis’s The Evolution Man (1989)
The King and I, or How the Bottom Has Dropped Out of the Wise Man Business (1970)
Honey, These Bees Had a Heart of Gold (1976)
That Sounds Fungi, It Must Be the Dawn Chorus (1976)
Introduction to The Leaky Establishment by David Langford (2001)
The Meaning of My Christmas (1997)
Alien Christmas (1987)
2001: The Vision and the Reality (2000)
The God Moment (2008)
A Genuine Absent-minded Professor (2010)
Saturdays (2011)

Days of Rage
On Excellence in Schools. Education: What It Means to You (1997)
The Orangutans Are Dying (2000)
The NHS Is Seriously Injured (2008)
I’m Slipping Away a Bit at a Time . . . and All I Can Do Is Watch It Happen (2008)
Taxworld (2009)
Point Me to Heaven When the Final Chapter Comes (2009)
The Richard Dimbleby Lecture: Shaking Hands with Death (2010)
At Last We Have Real Compassion in Assisted-Dying Guidelines (2010)
Assisted Dying: It’s Time the Government Gave Us the Right to End Our Lives (2011)
Death Knocked and We Let Him In (2011)
A Week in the Death of Terry Pratchett (2011)

And Finally...
Terry Pratchett’s Wild Unattached Footnotes to Life (1990)

References

External links

2014 non-fiction books
Terry Pratchett